Full Time is a 2021 French drama film written and directed by Éric Gravel. The film stars Laure Calamy. The film had its world premiere at the 78th Venice International Film Festival on 2 September 2021.

Synopsis
Single mother Julie works an exhausting job as head maid at a luxury Parisian hotel. Her frenetic daily routine includes commuting from her remote suburb into Paris, tending to her children Nolan and Chloé, and searching for a better job to make use of her university education. Her schedule is further disrupted by an immobilizing transport strike in Paris. The strike causes her to arrive late to work and late to pick up her children from their nanny, Madame Lusigny. She is forced to hitchhike or pay for expensive taxis while awaiting alimony payments from her ex-husband. On the move for almost every moment of the day, Julie is constantly on the verge of a breakdown. When she finally receives a job interview at a marketing firm, she has to carefully cut corners and ask co-workers to cover for her.

Cast

Production

Development
Laure Calamy and other actresses went through maid service training to prepare for their roles. Calamy underwent a one-day course at Le Bristol Paris hotel to understand the gestures and postures specific to the profession. Through her friend Tiziri Kandi, Calamy was given the opportunity to communicate with exploited chambermaids before filming. Kandi, who is a union leader for the Hôtels de Prestige et Économiques (HPE) division of the General Confederation of Labour (CGT), represented the striking chambermaids of the Ibis Batignolles hotel in Paris. Calamy questioned the striking maids about their physical health concerns, the hellish pace of their work and aspects of their personal lives.

Filming
The film was shot in Paris and in the Yonne department, including the communes Collemiers, Sens and Pont-sur-Yonne. Julie's house in the film is located in Collemiers, a commune familiar to the director Éric Gravel, who lives in the Sens area, and whose many residents – like Julie – commute to Paris by train every day for work. The station that appears in the film is that of Gare de Pont-sur-Yonne.

Release
Full Time was selected to be screened in the  section at the 78th Venice International Film Festival. It had its world premiere at Venice on 2 September 2021. It was theatrically released in France by Haut et Court on 16 March 2022. Music Box Films has given the film a limited theatrical release in the United States beginning in February 2023.

Reception

Box office
Full Time grossed $29,933 in the United States, and $1.5 million in France for a worldwide total of $1.9 million.

Critical response
On Rotten Tomatoes, the film holds an approval rating of 98% based on 45 reviews, with an average rating of 8.3/10. The website's consensus reads, "Led by Laure Calamy's gripping performance, Full Time serves as a sobering reminder that just staying financially afloat can sometimes feel like a white-knuckle thriller." According to Metacritic, which assigned a weighted average score of 83 out of 100 based on 13 critics, the film received "universal acclaim".

Reviewing the film following its Venice premiere, Wendy Ide of Screen Daily wrote, "It's a propulsively intense piece of filmmaking - at times a bit like watching a highwire chainsaw juggling act about to go horribly and catastrophically wrong." The Sydney Morning Heralds Paul Byrnes gave the film 4 out of 5 stars, commending Laure Calamy's performance and praising her "extraordinary ability to project warmth, as well as strength. Her character here is down but never out, no matter how hard life pushes her."

William Repass of Slant Magazine gave Full Time 2.5 out of 4 stars, criticising that the film "doesn't have much to say about organized labor, or labor in general, other than that work can be really stressful."

Awards and nominations

References

External links
 

2021 films
2020s French films
2020s French-language films
2021 drama films
French drama films
France 2 Cinéma films
Films set in Paris
Films shot in Paris
Films shot in Yonne
Maids in films
Films about single parent families